Ipomoea imperati, the beach morning-glory (a name it shares with Ipomoea pes-caprae), is a species of flowering plant in the family Convolvulaceae. Like Ipomoea pes-caprae, its seeds disperse by floating in seawater. It has been found on the sandy shores of every continent except Antarctica.

Ipomoea imperati and I. pes-caprae can be easily can be distinguished in that I. imperati has white flowers and I. pes-caprae usually has purple flowers. The leaves of I. imperati are more linear or lanceolate while those of I. pes-caprae tend to be more circular or ovate.

It is considered an invasive species in some places.

References

imperati
Plants described in 1866